Robert Elibekyan (born 21 April 1941) is an Armenian painter.

Biography
Robert Elibekyan was born in Tbilisi, Georgia. In 1960 he moved to Armenia and settled in Yerevan. 1960-1965 he studied in the Yerevan Arts and Theatre Institute. Since 1970 Elibekyan is a member of the Union of Artists of Armenia. For many years Elibekyan is successfully involved in stage design in theatres of Armenia and overseas. Simultaneously he worked as a designer and producer of a number of films shot at the ArmenFilm Studio.

Elibekyan's canvases are exhibited at famous museums and private collections such as the National Gallery of Armenia, Modern Art Museum of Yerevan, the Tretyakov Gallery and the Museum of Oriental Arts in Moscow, Alex Manoogian Museum in Detroit, Elyseum Palace in Paris, Presidential Residence of the RA, RA Government Office, the White House in Washington, Zimerli Museum in New-Jersi, in RA Matenadaran, Sergey Parajanov Museum of RA, Etchmiadzin Cathedral Museum.

Personal exhibitions 
Elibekyan's exhibitions were organized and held not only in Armenia, Moscow, Vilnius and other cities of former Soviet Union, but also in major centers of Europe-Gallerie Soleil, Montreal, Gallery Artima, Paris, Gallery Catherine Guerard, Paris, International City of Arts, Paris, Gallery Claude Bessard, Paris, Gallery L'Oeil, Brussels, Gallery 22, Antwerpen and America-AGBU Gallery, Los Angeles, in Detroit and Boston.

Awards 
1977 ‐ Honoured Art Worker of the Republic of Armenia
1981 ‐ State Prize of the Republic of Armenia
2001 ‐ Movses Khorenatsi medal
2008 ‐ People’s Artist of the Republic of Armenia

Family 
Grandfather- Haroutyun Elibekyan, ingot master
Father- Vagharshak Elibekyan, Honored Artist of Georgia
Mother- Flora Elibekyan
Brother- Henry Elibekyan, Artist
Sister- Louisa Elibekyan, architect
Wife - Mary Haytayan-Elibekyan, teacher
Son - Yervand Elibekyan, doctor
Son - Areg Elibekyan, artist

See also
List of Armenian artists
List of Armenians
Culture of Armenia

Books
"24 Armenian Artists from Soviet Armenia & France", Gulbenkian Hall, London (England), 1979
"Armenian Colors" catalog, 12 contemporary artists from Soviet ARmenia, AGBU Gallery, New York (USA), 1978 
Robert Elibekian, Calerie Soleil, Montreal, Canada
"Robert Elibekyan", catalog, Editions GARNI, Imprimerie EREBOUNI, BEIRUT, 1992
Robert Elibekian, Book-album, 2014

Gallery

References

External links

 Robert Elibekyan's biography

1941 births
Artists from Tbilisi
Georgian people of Armenian descent
Living people
20th-century painters from Georgia (country)
21st-century painters from Georgia (country)
20th-century Armenian painters
21st-century Armenian painters